Rizwan Zaheer former member of parliament from Balrampur Uttar Pradesh, India. Now a senior leader and Muslim face of Samajwadi Party.

References

Samajwadi Party politicians
1965 births
Living people
Samajwadi Party politicians from Uttar Pradesh
India MPs 1998–1999
India MPs 1999–2004